Oh-be-joyful Creek is a stream in Gunnison County, Colorado, in the United States.

Oh-be-joyful Creek was so named in the 19th century after valuable ore was discovered in the gulch.

See also
List of rivers of Colorado

References

Rivers of Gunnison County, Colorado
Rivers of Colorado